Maria Sharapova was the defending champion, but could not compete due to an upper respiratory viral illness.
Magdaléna Rybáriková won this tournament. Rebecca Marino retired in the final, when the result was 6–2 for the Slovak player.

Seeds

Draw

Finals

Top half

Bottom half

Qualifying

This section displays the qualifying draw of the 2011 Cellular South Cup.

Players

Seeds

Qualifiers

Lucky losers
  Alexandra Stevenson

Qualifying draw

First qualifier

Second qualifier

Third qualifier

Fourth qualifier

External links
Main and Qualifying Draw

2011 Regions Morgan Keegan Championships and the Cellular South Cup
2011 WTA Tour
2011 - qualifying